Uncial 0130 (in the Gregory-Aland numbering), ε 80 (Soden), is a Greek uncial manuscript of the New Testament, dated palaeographically to the 9th-century. Formerly it was labelled by Wc.

Description 
The codex contains a small part of the Mark 1:31-2:16; Luke 1:20-31.64-79; 2:24-48, on 7 parchment leaves. It is written in two columns per page, 22 lines per page, in large uncial letters. The writing is similar to Codex Sangallensis 48 but bigger. It has diacritic marks and accents.

It is a palimpsest, the upper text has Latin Vulgate. The leaves were washed to make a palimpsest, and the writing erased in parts by a knife.

The Greek text of this codex is a representative of the mixed text-type, with a strong element of the Byzantine text-type. Hermann von Soden classified it to the textual family I'. Aland placed it in Category III.

According to the Claremont Profile Method it has mixed text in Luke 1. In Luke 10 and Luke 20 the manuscript is defective.

History 

It is dated by the INTF to the 9th-century.

The manuscript was examined by Tischendorf.

Four leaves of the codex are housed at the Abbey library of Saint Gall (18, fol. 143-146; 45, fol. 1-2) in St. Gallen, and three leaves in Zürich (Zentralbibliothek, C 57, fol. 5, 74, 93, 135).

See also 

 List of New Testament uncials
 Textual criticism

References

Further reading 

 Constantin von Tischendorf, Monumenta Sacra Inedita III, Fragmenta Origenianae Octateuchi Editionis (1857), (Prolegomena p. iii, xxxix, xl; pp. 291–298; plate II).
 Hermann von Soden, "Die Schriften des Neuen Testaments, in ihrer ältesten erreichbaren Textgestalt hergestellt auf Grund ihrer Textgeschichte," Verlag von Arthur Glaue, Berlin 1902-1910, pp. 78–79. 
 Alban Dodd, Neue Palimpsest-Bruchstücke der griechischen Bibel; Zwei bekannte neugelesene Palimpsest-Bruchstücke einre St Galler Evangelienhandschrift, Biblische Zeitschrift 18 (1929), pp. 241–270.

External links 
 
 Codex Sangallensis images of the codex at the Stiffsbibliothek St. Gallen
 Wieland Willker, Uncial 0130 at the "Textual Commentary"

Manuscripts of the Abbey library of Saint Gall
Palimpsests
Greek New Testament uncials
9th-century biblical manuscripts
Vulgate manuscripts